Rae Crowther (December 11, 1902 – November 3, 1980) was a professional football player for the National Football League's Frankford Yellow Jackets from 1925 until 1926. He won the 1926 NFL Championship with the Yellow Jackets. Outside of the NFL, he played for the Millville Big Blue, a successful independent team out of New Jersey. In 1925 Rae and Millville played several pick-up games in Florida against the Tampa Cardinals, featuring Red Grange. Rae's brother Saville also played alongside him with Frankford and Millville in 1925.

Rae later became a very successful line coach at Drexel University, Harvard University, and the University of Pennsylvania, which at the time were football powerhouses. In 1932, he became the designer and founder of the football blocking sled, used by many high school, college and professional teams today. His sleds received praise from Green Bay Packers coach, Vince Lombardi, and Woody Hayes of the Ohio State Buckeyes.

References

1902 births
1980 deaths
American football ends
Colgate Raiders football players
Frankford Yellow Jackets players
Drexel Dragons football coaches
Harvard Crimson football coaches
Millville Football & Athletic Club players
Penn State Nittany Lions football players
Penn Quakers football coaches
People from Haddonfield, New Jersey
People from Radnor Township, Pennsylvania
Players of American football from Pennsylvania
20th-century American businesspeople